Rosemary de Brissac Dobson, AO (18 June 192027 June 2012) was an Australian poet, who was also an illustrator, editor and anthologist. She published fourteen volumes of poetry, was published in almost every annual volume of Australian Poetry and has been translated into French and other languages.

The Judges of the New South Wales Premier's Literary Awards in 1996 described her significance as follows: "The level of originality and strength of Rosemary's poetry cannot be underestimated, nor can the contribution she has made to Australian literature. Her literary achievements, especially her poetry, are a testament to her talent and dedication to her art."

Life
Rosemary Dobson was born in Sydney, the second daughter of English-born A.A.G. (Arthur) Dobson and Marjorie (née Caldwell). Her paternal grandfather was Austin Dobson, a poet and essayist. Her father died when she was five years old. She attended the prestigious Frensham School where her mother obtained work as a housemistress. Here she met Australian children's author, Joan Phipson, who had been asked to set up a printing press. She stayed on, after completion of her studies, as an apprentice teacher of art and art history.

When she turned 21, Dobson attended the University of Sydney as a non-degree student. She also studied design with Australian artist, Thea Proctor. She worked as an editor and reader for the publisher Angus and Robertson with Beatrice Davis and Nan McDonald.

She married the publisher Alec Bolton (1926–1996), whom she met while working at Angus and Robertson, in Sydney, and they had three children. During these Sydney years she became well-acquainted with other writers and artists, such as poet Douglas Stewart and his artist wife, Margaret Coen, writer and artist Norman Lindsay, Kenneth Slessor, and James McAuley. They lived in London from 1966 to 1971, during which she travelled widely in Europe and cemented her lifelong interest in art.

The Boltons moved to Canberra in 1971 where Alec Bolton set up the Publications area of the National Library of Australia. In Canberra they were friendly with David Campbell, A. D. Hope, R. F. Brissenden and Dorothy Green. As time wore on, her local circle expanded to include younger writers such as Alan Gould and Geoff Page.

Her older sister, Ruth Dobson, became Australia's first woman career diplomat ambassador.

Rosemary Dobson died in a Canberra nursing home on 27 June 2012.

Literary career
Dobson began writing poetry at the age of seven. Her first collection, In a Convex Mirror, appeared in 1944, and was followed by thirteen more volumes. Her work demonstrates her love of art, antiquity and mythology as well as her experience of motherhood. Hooton describes her work as both consistent and varied: "consistency balanced with variety, reserve with passion, past with present, tradition with innovation, ancient myth with contemporary life, domesticity with culture, and above all Australia with Europe.

Douglas Stewart suggested that she is "a religious person in the deepest and most important sense". In her introduction to her 1973 Selected Poems, Dobson wrote of her aims: "I hope it will be perceived that the poems presented here are part of a search for something only fugitively glimpsed, a state of grace which one once knew, or imagined, or from which one was turned away. Surely everyone who writes poetry would agree this is part of it - a doomed but urgent wish to express the inexpressible".

In addition to poetry she produced anthologies including two, with poet David Campbell, containing their translations of Russian poetry. She also wrote prose.

Brindabella Press
In 1972, Dobson's husband, Alec Bolton, set up Brindabella Press on which he worked for the rest of his life, working more actively after his retirement from the Library in 1987. Dobson had input as editorial adviser and proof-reader. Both she and Bolton enjoyed the art of the private press in a time when computer type-setting was taking over and producing a more standardised product.

Two early publications from the press, published in 1973, were a small sheet edition of some of Dobson's poems titled Three poems on water-springs and a small book of poems by David Campbell titled Starting from Central Station : a sequence of poems.

Portraits
Norman Lindsay made three portraits of Dobson, the first one at the suggestion of Douglas Stewart who suggested he draw or paint Australian writers. Lindsay's first portrait of Dobson was a drawing, but it was then suggested that he do an oil painting. Lindsay asked her to wear her rose-coloured evening dress. This painting is now owned by the National Library of Australia, as is the dress she wore for the portrait. Dobson sat a third time for Lindsay, at his request and wearing clothes of his suggestion. This portrait is now missing.

Artist Thea Proctor made four drawings of Dobson while Dobson was attending Proctor's art classes.

Awards
1948: The Sydney Morning Herald Poetry Prize for The Ship of Ice
1966 Myer Award II for Australian Poetry for Cock Crow
1977 Australian National University Honorary Convocation Member
1979: Robert Frost Award
1984: Patrick White Award
1984: Grace Leven Prize for Poetry for Best Volume of Poetry for the Year The Three Fates & Other Poems
1985: Victorian Premier's Literary Award Joint Winner for The Three Fates
1986: Association for the Study of Australian Literature Honorary Life Member
1987: Officer of the Order of Australia (AO)
1996: Australia Council Writer’s Emeritus Award
1996: University of Sydney Honorary Doctor of Letters
2001: The Age Book of the Year Book of the Year and Poetry Awards for Untold Lives & Later Poems
2006: NSW Alice Award
2006: New South Wales Premier's Literary Awards Special Award

Bibliography 
Poetry
 In a Convex Mirror (Dymocks, 1944)
 The Ship of Ice (Angus & Robertson, 1948)
 Child with a Cockatoo (Angus & Robertson, 1955)
 Selected Poems (Angus & Robertson, 1963)
 Cock Crow (Angus & Robertson, 1965)
 L'Enfant au Cacatoès trans. M. Diesendorf & L. Dautheuil (Pierre Seghers, 1965)
 Selected Poems (Angus & Robertson, 1973) 
 Greek Coins: A sequence of poems (Brindabella, 1977) 
 Over the Frontier (Angus & Robertson, 1978) 
 The Continuance of Poetry (Brindabella, 1981) 
 The Three Fates & Other Poems (Hale & Iremonger, 1984) 
 Seeing and Believing (NLA, 1990) 
 Collected Poems (Collins/Angus & Robertson, 1991) 
 Untold Lives & Later Poems (Brandl & Schlesinger, 2000) 
 Poems to Hold or Let Go (Ampersand Duck, 2008) 
 Rosemary Dobson Collected (UQP, 2012) 

Translation
 Moscow Trefoil: Poems from the Russian of Anna Akhmatova and Osip Mandelstam with David Campbell and Natalie Staples (ANU, 1975) 
 Seven Russian Poets: Imitations with David Campbell (UQP, 1980) 

Non-Fiction
 Focus on Ray Crooke (UQP, 1971) 
 A World of Difference: Australian poetry and painting in the 1940s (Wentworth Press, 1973)

Legacy
The Rosemary Dobson Award was awarded as part of the ACT Poetry Award by the ACT Government between 2005 and 2011, for an unpublished poem by an Australian poet.

Notes 
Adelaide, Debra (1988) Australian Women Writers: A Bibliographic Guide, London, Pandora
Anderson, D.J. (1996) Citation for Honorary Award to Rosemary Dobson AO
Bolton, Rosemary Dobson (2005) "The rose-coloured dress", National Library of Australia News, XV (9): 7-9, June 2005
Hooton, Joy (ed) (2000a) Rosemary Dobson: A Celebration, National Library of Australia 
Hooton, Joy (2000b) "Rosemary Dobson: A Life of Making Poetry" in Hooton, Joy (ed) (2000) Rosemary Dobson: A celebration, National Library of Australia 
NSW Premier's Literary Awards Judges Comments
Smith, Graeme Kinross (1980) Australian Writers, West Melbourne, Nelson
Tranter, John Ernest. "Interview: Rosemary Dobson in conversation with John Tranter, 8 December 2004." 5,800 words, illustrated. 
Wilde, W., Hooton, J. & Andrews, B (1994) The Oxford Companion of Australian Literature 2nd ed. South Melbourne, Oxford University Press

References

External links 
 Interview, by John Tranter
 Papers of Rosemary Dobson Ms 4955
 "Poetry Special: 'The Continuance of Poetry' by Rosemary Dobson", on ABC Radio National Book Show Accessed: 2008-05-15

1920 births
Australian women poets
2012 deaths
Officers of the Order of Australia
Patrick White Award winners
Writers from Sydney
University of Sydney alumni
People educated at Frensham School
Australian people of English descent
Australian illustrators
Australian women illustrators
Women anthologists
20th-century Australian poets
20th-century Australian women writers